Luma longidentalis is a moth in the family Crambidae. It was described by George Hampson in 1903. It is found in Bhutan and New Guinea.

References

Moths described in 1903
Spilomelinae